The Phoenix Open previously known as the Phoenix Thunderbird Championships or Thunderbird Classic or Thunderbird Invitation  is a defunct Grand Prix affiliated tennis tournament that started in 1953 and ended in 1970.

History
Originally started as an amateur event from 1953 to 1968, the tournament went open in 1969 and ended in 1970. It was held in Phoenix, Arizona in the United States and played on indoor hard courts from 1953 to 1965 and outdoor hard courts from 1966 to 1970.

Finals

Singles
Included:

Doubles

References

Sources
 ATP Results Archive

Defunct tennis tournaments in the United States
Hard court tennis tournaments in the United States
Grand Prix tennis circuit